Donatella Schiavon ( Talpo, born 10 July 1957) is an Italian former swimmer who competed in the 1972 Summer Olympics and in the 1976 Summer Olympics.

References

1957 births
Living people
Italian female swimmers
Female butterfly swimmers
Olympic swimmers of Italy
Swimmers at the 1972 Summer Olympics
Swimmers at the 1976 Summer Olympics
Mediterranean Games gold medalists for Italy
Mediterranean Games medalists in swimming
Swimmers at the 1971 Mediterranean Games
Swimmers at the 1975 Mediterranean Games